Glandora prostrata, the shrubby gromwell, creeping gromwell or purple gromwell (names it shares with Lithospermum purpurocaeruleum and Glandora diffusa), is a species of Glandora native to Portugal, Spain and France. Its cultivars 'Grace Ward' and 'Heavenly Blue' have gained the Royal Horticultural Society's Award of Garden Merit.

Subspecies
A subspecies is currently accepted:

Glandora prostrata subsp. lusitanica (Samp.) D.C.Thomas

References

Garden plants of Europe
Plants described in 2008